The Painter on the Road to Tarascon is a painting by Vincent van Gogh that is believed to have been destroyed during the Second World War during an air raid on Germany. It depicts the artist on his way to work, and it is thought to be the first self-portrait that van Gogh painted during his time in Arles. The work has influenced numerous modern artists, serving as an especially important inspiration to Francis Bacon.

See also
List of works by Vincent van Gogh

References

External links

Lost paintings
1888 paintings
Paintings by Vincent van Gogh
Paintings about painting